George Pal (born György Pál Marczincsak; ; February 1, 1908 – May 2, 1980) was a Hungarian-American animator, film director and producer, principally associated with the fantasy and science-fiction genres. He became an American citizen after emigrating from Europe.

He was nominated for Academy Awards (in the category Best Short Subjects, Cartoon) for seven consecutive years (1942–1948) and received an honorary award in 1944. This makes him the second-most nominated Hungarian exile (together with William S. Darling and Ernest Laszlo) after Miklós Rózsa.

Early life and career
Pal was born in Cegléd, Hungary, the son of György Pál Marczincsak, Sr. and his wife Mária. He graduated from the Hungarian University of Fine Arts in 1928 (aged 20). From 1928 to 1931, he made films for Hunnia Film Studio of Budapest, Hungary.

At the age of 23 in 1931, he married Elisabeth "Zsóka" Grandjean, and after moving to Berlin, founded Trickfilm-Studio GmbH Pal und Wittke, with UFA Studios as its main customer from 1931 to 1933. During this time, he patented the Pal-Doll technique (known as Puppetoons in the US).

In 1933, he worked in Prague; in 1934, he made a film advertisement in his hotel room in Paris, and was invited by Philips to make two more ad shorts. He started to use Pal-Doll techniques in Eindhoven, in a former butchery, then at villa-studio Suny Home. He left Germany as the Nazis came to power.

He made five films before 1939 for the British company Horlicks Malted Milk. In December of that year, aged 32, he emigrated from Europe to the United States, and began work for Paramount Pictures. At this time, his friend Walter Lantz helped him obtain American citizenship.

As an animator, he made the Puppetoons series in the 1940s, which led to him being awarded an honorary Oscar in 1943 for "the development of novel methods and techniques in the production of short subjects known as Puppetoons". Pal then switched to live-action film-making with The Great Rupert (1950).

He is best remembered as the producer of several science-fiction and fantasy films in the 1950s and 1960s, such as When Worlds Collide, four of which were collaborations with director Byron Haskin, including The War of the Worlds (1953). He himself directed Tom Thumb (1958), The Time Machine (1960), and The Wonderful World of the Brothers Grimm (1962).

Death
In May 1980, he died in Beverly Hills, California, of a heart attack at the age of 72, and is buried in Holy Cross Cemetery, Culver City, California. The Voyage of the Berg, on which he was working at the time, was never completed.

Awards and honours
Pal has a star on the Hollywood Walk of Fame at 1722 Vine St. In 1980, the Academy of Motion Picture Arts and Sciences founded the "George Pal Lecture on Fantasy in Film" series in his memory.

George Pal (along with the film When Worlds Collide) is among the many references to classic science fiction and horror films in the opening theme ("Science Fiction/Double Feature") of both the stage musical The Rocky Horror Show and its cinematic counterpart, The Rocky Horror Picture Show (1975).

In 1975, Pal received the Golden Plate Award of the American Academy of Achievement, as well as the San Diego Comic Con Inkpot Award.

Pal's Puppetoons Tulips Shall Grow and John Henry and the Inky-Poo (1946) were added to the Library of Congress 1997 and 2015 National Film Registry. One of the Tubby the Tuba models along with a frog and three string instruments were donated to the Smithsonian Institution for the National Museum of American History.

Preservation
The Academy Film Archive has preserved several of George Pal's films, including Jasper and the Beanstalk, John Henry and the Inky Poo, and Radio Röhren Revolution.

Live-action feature films

Unreleased, unfinished, or projected films
Gulliver's Travels (1935)
Sinbad (1935)
Three Little Princes (1935) 
Casey Jones (1945)
Davy Crockett (1945) 
Johnny Appleseed (1946) 
After Worlds Collide (1955)
Odd John (1967) (rights acquired only)
Logan's Run (1968)
When the Sleeper Wakes (1972)
War of the Worlds  (1974–75) Unfinished TV pilot
Doc Savage: The Arch Enemy of Evil (1976)
The Time Traveller (1977–78) aka Time Machine II.  A novelization with Joe Morhaim was published posthumously in 1981.
The Wonderful Wizard of Oz (1979)
The Disappearance (1980) (only in preproduction)
Voyage of the Berg (1980) (only in preproduction)

Posthumous collection
The Fantasy Film Worlds of George Pal (1985) (Produced and directed by Arnold Leibovit)
The Puppetoon Movie (1987) (Produced and directed by Arnold Leibovit)
The Puppetoon Movie Volume 2 (2020) (Produced and directed by Arnold Leibovit)
The Puppetoon Movie Volume 3 (2023?) (Produced and directed by Arnold Leibovit)

References

Bibliography
 Gail Morgan Hickman. The Films of George Pal. South Brunswick, NJ: A.S. Barnes & Co., 1977. .
 Schepp, Ole and Kamphuis, Fred. George Pal in Holland 1934–1939. Den Haag: Kleinoffsetdrukkerij Kapsenberg, 1983.
 Miller, Thomas Kent. Mars in the Movies: A History. Jefferson, North Carolina: McFarland & Company, 2016. .
 Peters, Mette. "George Pal’s ‘Cavalcade of Colours, Music and Dolls’: 1930s Advertising Films in Transnational Contexts". In: Animation and Advertising. Thompson, Kirsten Moana, Cook, Malcolm (Eds.). Palgrave Macmillan, 2019. .

External links
 
 
 George Pal Lecture on Fantasy in Film 
 A Cinema of Miracles: Remembering George Pal 
 George Pal: A Career in Perspective 
 George Pal
 War Of The Worlds review plus info on proposed WOTW TV series

1908 births
1980 deaths
Academy Honorary Award recipients
American animated film directors
American animated film producers
Burials at Holy Cross Cemetery, Culver City
Emigrants from Nazi Germany to the United States
English-language film directors
Hungarian animated film directors
Hungarian animated film producers
Hungarian emigrants to the United States
People from Cegléd
People with acquired American citizenship
Science fiction film directors
Stop motion animators
Inkpot Award winners